Ukrainian Amateur Football Championship is an annual association football competition in Ukraine among amateur teams. The competition is administered by the Ukrainian Association of Amateur Football (AAFU).

The championship replaced the Soviet competitions among collectives of physical culture (KFK).

Competition organization

Current format

Majority participating teams that compete in the Ukrainian Amateur football competition also compete in their regional (oblast) football championships. There are no requirements or restrictions on amount of representation from each region and is on voluntary (and/or invitational) basis. There is no relegation. The pool of teams, competition organization, and season regulations are reviewed on annual basis.

Since 2014, there is an intention to integrate the amateur competitions in the national football league system, so there would be systematic and well understood promotion and relegation process. The number of groups was reduced and their size was increased, yet to the point for the participating teams still be able to compete in their respective regional competitions. Since the recent reorganization, the competition format still preserved its two phases: the first being several multi-team groups divided by geographic principle, the second is a play-off among the groups leaders to identify the season champion.

There is also an idea to reform the competition as a semi-pro regional league competitions, possibly combining with the existing professional Druha Liha (Ukrainian Second League). As the effort to reintegrate the competition into the national league system, the competitions changed back again to fall-spring calendar in 2016 synchronizing the competition's calendar with professional-level championship.

All participating teams may apply to be admitted to Druha Liha (Ukrainian Second League) irrelevant to their placement in a given season of the amateur championship.

During the 2017–18 Ukrainian Football Amateur League, 26 teams were split into three groups with top teams advancing to the league's playoffs starting at quarterfinals.

Previously in 2016–17 Ukrainian Football Amateur League, 24 teams were split into two groups with winners advancing to the final game on a neutral field.

Competitions in Soviet Ukraine (competitions among KFK teams)
Since in 1964, there were established two different championships one among teams of masters (Soviet analog for professional teams) and another among collectives of physical culture (Soviet acronym KFK as representatives of "mass sports", fizkulturniks). The very first championship among KFK originally consisted of 5 to 6 groups based on geographic principle. Each group consisted of about 8-10 teams and later grew to around 16. All teams within own groups played each other home and away games as per round robin principle. Each group winners were advancing to finals which were conducted at predesignated location with a single game round robin tournament. 

The original (first) members were:

Enerhiya Nova Kakhovka
Strila Zaporizhzhia
Kolhospnyk Ukrayina
Torpedo Mykolaiv
Shakhtar Krasnyi Luch
Suputnyk Poltava
Start Chuhuyiv
Elektron Romny
Avanhard Ordzhonikidze

Mashynobudivnyk Druzhkivka
Shakhtar Vatutine
Dnipro KremHES (Svitlovodsk)
Burevisnyk Vinnytsia
Podillia Kamianets-Podilskyi
Torpedo Odesa
Kolhospnyk Kitsman
Avanhard Pryluky

Prohres Berdychiv
Spartak Bila Tserkva
Vostok Kyiv
Tekstylnyk Rivne
LVVPU SA I VMF
Budivelnyk Khust
Khimik Kalush
Druzhba Chortkiv
Lokomotyv Kovel

Since 1973 the winner of that final tournament was granted an opportunity to advance to the Soviet Second League.

Competitions in independent Ukraine
The Soviet format stayed until 1997, when there was created the Association of Amateur Football of Ukraine (AAFU).

Following the dissolution of the Soviet Union, amateur competitions were shifted to the fall/spring calendar. The group winners, however instead of continuing to the final pool as before, were actually promoted to intermediate level, so called "Transitional League" which existed for just several years as a semi-professional tournament.

In 1996 and 1997 there took place a reorganization of all competitions under auspices of the Football Federation of Ukraine. Clubs that were competing at professional level, in 1996 organized the Professional Football League of Ukraine. The national amateur competitions were reorganized as AAFU. In 1997 the competition format also changed and there was reintroduced the final pool to identified the national winner of the amateur competition. The new format basically consisted of two stages with a final tournament chosen in the preselected city as previously in the Soviet competition. The size of groups was reduced as the number of teams decreased. In 1999, the competition calendar changed back to spring-fall competition so called all-summer event from the "european" fall/spring calendar.

In 2000 the league competitions changed again introducing extra stage (third) to avoid sudden withdrawals and eliminate financially suffering teams. In 2005 it was decided to eliminate the final game while still continue with the final tournament. In 2008 another change followed, which reduced the format back to two stages, however that did not solve the problem to increase the number of teams in the competition.

In 2010 there was an idea to incorporate the Amateur Association into the PFL as the Third League, eliminating the national amateur competition. The 2010 season also saw a record low number of participants in the competition, a pattern that might eliminate the association naturally in any case, due to poor management.

In 2016 it was decided to change back to fall-spring calendar with intention to reincorporate the amateur tier back to the Ukrainian football league structure. The competition in 2016 was shortened and later that year there started new season 2016-17. Number of groups has been reduced and number of teams in each group was increased, thus turning competitions into a true league competitions. Also the PFL announced that all clubs will be required to participate in the amateur tier before being admitted to professional level. Yet the declaration was left to be as empty and some teams were allowed to skip the amateur tier on various dubious excuses. Another declaration of the PFL stating that the league will expunge the last placed teams has been consistent, yet more than often teams relegated from professional level were simply liquidated by owners.

Notable clubs
There are former amateur and KFK teams that eventually made it to the Ukrainian Premier League.

FC Mariupol (former Lokomotyv Zhdanov), Stal Kamianske (former Metalurh Dniprodzerzhynsk), Nyva Ternopil (former Nyva Berezhany), Torpedo Zaporizhzhia, Naftovyk Okhtyrka, Vorskla Poltava, Kremin Kremenchuk, Stal Alchevsk (former Stal Komunarsk), Kolos Kovalivka, FC Mynai, Inhulets–Pyatykhatska Petrove, Rukh Lviv–Vynnyky

Winners

 In bold are identified clubs that were granted professional status and were promoted to the Ukrainian Second League.
 ‡ – winners of the Ukrainian Amateur Cup

Association of Amateur Football of Ukraine (AAFU)

FFU Amateur Football League
Decrease in number of participants trifold in 1995 and introduction of final tournament instead of simple single final group in 1996.

KFK competitions of Ukraine
Competitions shifted to fall–spring system instead of spring-fall (summer) system and missed half of the season. There was no final group of six group winners as in previous season and all group winners were announced as champions.

KFK competition of Ukrainian SSR
In bold identified teams that were admitted to professional level (became teams of masters) the following season.
‡ – winners of the Ukrainian football cup among KFK

Top scorers

Statistics

Winners by club
Statistic as of 2021

Note
KZEZO stands for Kakhovkan Plant of Electro-Welding Equipment (Kakhovsky Zavod Elektro-Zvariuvalnoho Obladnannia).
The first team of Yednist-2 also participated in the competition and once placed the third. That team currently competes on the professional level. On the club level at this level of competition Yednist have titles of a winner, a runner, and two of the third place.

Winners by region
Statistic as of 2022

Championship winners that never turned professional
 FC Ivan Odesa
 FC Karpaty Kolomyia
 FC Luzhany
 FC Nove Zhyttia Andriivka
 FC ODEK Orzhiv
 FC Zoria Khorostkiv (group winner)

Teams with the biggest number of seasons ("Most loyal teams")
 23 – Shakhtar Sverdlovsk
 22 – Metalurh Kupiansk, Lokomotyv Znamianka
 18 – Shakhtar Oleksandria, ODEK Orzhiv
 17 – Khimik Kalush, Avanhard Lozova, Bilshovyk Kyiv
 16 – Tytan Armyansk, Naftovyk Dolyna, Sokil Lviv
 15 – Refryzherator Fastiv, Sokil Berezhany
 14 – Vostok Kyiv, Radyst Kirovohrad
 13 – Lokomotyv Smila, Kirovets Makiivka, Avanhard Rovenky, Frehat Pervomaisk, Silmash Kovel, Prohres Berdychiv
 12 – Pivdenstal Yenakiieve, Pokuttia Kolomyia (including Silmash), Lokomotyv Kupiansk
 11 – Yednist Plysky (including Yednist-2 Plysky), Avanhard Kramatorsk (including Bliuminh), Shakhtar Dzerzhynsk, SC Kakhovka, Torpedo Mykolaiv, Naftovyk Okhtyrka (including Naftovyk-2)

Teams that skipped the tier
The following clubs/teams skipped the amateur competitions or competitions among collectives of physical culture and were admitted to professional competitions. A lot of times some second teams of professional clubs that were already competing were allowed to enter professional ranks and without participation in amateur competitions. The AAFU competitions over time became more of an option rather than a mandatory tier in a football league pyramid hierarchy.
1992 : none (15 promoted)
1992: FC Avanhard Zhydachiv, FC Dynamo Luhansk (6 promoted)
1993: FC Medyk Morshyn, FC Viktor Zaporizhzhia, FC Lviv (1992) (6 promoted)
1994: none (12 promoted)
1995: none (9 promoted)
1996: FC Petrivtsi, FC Nyva Bershad (6 promoted)
1997: FC Karpaty-2 Lviv, FC Borysfen Boryspil, FC SKA-Lotto Odesa, FC Dynamo Odessa, FC Dnipro-2 Dnipropetrovsk, FC Fortuna Sharhorod, FC Zirka-2 Kirovohrad, FC Vorskla-2 Poltava, FC Metalurh-2 Donetsk, FC Hirnyk Pavlohrad (10 promoted)
1998: FC VPS Kramatorsk, FC Metalurh-2 Zaporizhzhia, FC Kryvbas-2 Kryvyi Rih
1999: FC Prykarpattia-2 Ivano-Frankivsk, FC Nyva Vinnytsia, FC Obolon-2 Kyiv, FC ADOMS Kremenchuk, FC Mashynobudivnyk Druzhkivka
2000: FC Ternopil-Nyva-2, FC Dnipro-3 Dnipropetrovsk, FC Cherkasy-2, FC Shakhtar-3 Donetsk, FC Metalurh-2 Mariupol, SSSOR-Metalurh Zaporizhzhia, FC Stal-2 Alchevsk, FC Krasyliv, FC Sokil Zolochiv (2 promoted)
2001: FC Zakarpattia-2 Uzhhorod, FC Borysfen-2 Boryspil, FC Obolon-2 Kyiv, FC Metalurh-2 Donetsk, FC Chornohora Ivano-Frankivsk, FC Chaika-VMS Sevastopol, FC Torpedo Zaporizhzhia, FC Dynamo Simferopol (5 promoted)
2002: none (4 promoted)
2003: FC Arsenal-2 Kyiv, FC Kryvbas-2 Kryvyi Rih, FC Palmira Odesa (7 promoted)
2004: PFC Oleksandriya, MFC Oleksandriya, FC Fakel Ivano-Frankivsk (5 promoted)
2005: MFC Zhytomyr, FC Kryvbas-2 Kryvyi Rih, FC Kharkiv-2, FC Knyazha Shchaslyve, FC Arsenal Kharkiv (5 promoted)
2006: none (2 promoted)
2007: FC Korosten, FC Komunalnyk Luhansk, FC Poltava, FC Tytan Donetsk (5 promoted)
2008: FC Knyazha-2 Schaslyve, PFC Sevastopol-2 (3 promoted)
2009: FC Lviv-2 (1 promoted)
2010: FC Chornomorets-2 Odesa, FC Dnipro-2 Dnipropetrovsk (1 promoted)
2011: PFC Sevastopol-2 (8 promoted)
2012: FC Obolon-2 Kyiv, FC Poltava-2 Karlivka (3 promoted)
2013: none (2 promoted)
2014: no teams were admitted at all
2015: NK Veres Rivne, FC Arsenal–Kyiv (4 promoted)
2016: FC Illichivets-2 Mariupol (9 promoted)
2017–18: MFC Mykolaiv-2, SC Dnipro-1 (6 promoted)
2018–19: none (6 promoted)
2019–20: FC Obolon-Brovar-2 Bucha, FC Chornomorets-2 Odesa, FC Avanhard-2 Kramatorsk (4 promoted)

Regions and teams

1992–2020

2020–present

Participated teams by regions
In bold are teams that played at least 10 seasons. In brackets is a number of seasons.

See also
 Ukrainian Amateur Cup
 Football Championship of the Ukrainian SSR

Notes

References

External links
 2001 season
 Statistics of Shakhtar Sverdlovsk
 Azovets Berdiansk (photos of newspapers). 
 Ukr-football.org compilations for Soviet KFK Ukraine (working site) and Amateur competitions.
 Ukrainian championship among amateurs (Чемпионат Украины среди любителей). Footballfacts.ru

 
Fourth level football leagues in Europe
Amateur
Amateur association football
Amateur sport in Ukraine